The Samuel N. Patterson House is a historic residence in the city of Xenia, Ohio, United States.  Built in the 1870s, it was named a historic site in 1976.

Samuel Patterson
Born in 1818, Samuel Patterson moved with his family from Washington, D.C. to Winchester, Ohio when he was four years old.  At the age of twenty-eight, he migrated to Xenia, where he became an important local businessman.  Although he entered into partnership with another man, Tobias Drees, in the ownership of a local mill, he sought to make himself known as a carpenter.  Eventually, Patterson developed a strong reputation for his multiple artistic abilities, including wood carving.

House
Patterson arranged for the construction of his house on the upscale North King Street around 1875.  Built of brick with a brick foundation, the two-story house includes elements of stone and metal.  The interior is particularly significant because of elements such as a unique music alcove with decorative panelling, as well as ornate original wood finishing with decorative molding.

Preservation

On 3 April 1974, much of Xenia's near north side was destroyed by one of the worst tornadoes on record.  The Patterson House fared better than most; it was severely damaged, but the owner chose to restore it rather than completing the demolition.  Two years later, it was listed on the National Register of Historic Places, qualifying because of its historically significant architecture.  Another house on North King that survived the tornado, known as the Millen-Schmidt House, is located two blocks to the south; it too was listed on the National Register in 1976.

References

Houses completed in 1875
Houses in Greene County, Ohio
Houses on the National Register of Historic Places in Ohio
National Register of Historic Places in Greene County, Ohio
Xenia, Ohio